John Jeffry Louis is the Chairman of Gannett Co, a board member of the Olayan Group and S. C. Johnson & Son, Inc.; and chairman of the U.S./ U.K. Fulbright Commission.

Biography
He is the son of former ambassador John J. Louis Jr. and his wife, Josephine Louis.

Louis was named to the Crain's Chicago Business "40 under 40" list in 2001 when his start-up, Parsons Group LLC, rose to the position of Inc. Magazine's list of 500 fastest-growing companies.

He also served as Vice Chairman of Frye-Louis Capital Management Inc, and a Director of S.C. Johnson & Son, The Johnson Financial Group, The City Bakery LLC, Schirf Brewing Company and Exiguous Inc.

References

21st-century British businesspeople
Businesspeople from London
Living people
1963 births
Williams College alumni
Phillips family (New England)
Samuel Curtis Johnson family